"Caught Up" is the third single by American rapper Ja Rule featuring Lloyd, from his sixth studio album R.U.L.E. and was released on May 25, 2005 by The Inc. Records and Def Jam Recordings.

Charts

References

2004 songs
2004 singles
Ja Rule songs
Lloyd (singer) songs
Def Jam Recordings singles
Songs written by Ja Rule
Songs written by Irv Gotti